Baron Jean de Beck (1588 – 30 August 1648) was a military man and governor of the Duchy of Luxembourg and of the County of Chiny.

He was born "Jean Beck", the son of Paul Beck and his wife Catherine Ronck (or Ronckart), in house no. 5 (demolished in 1958) of the rue de Trèves in the Grund of Luxembourg City.

In 1619, he joined the Austrian-Habsburg army. In 1632 or 1633, he was promoted to major-general by Albrecht von Wallenstein and, in 1634, was appointed commander of the Prague garrison.

On 25 February 1634, he was ennobled by Emperor Ferdinand II for his service in the Imperial army. In the summer of 1635, after leaving Wallenstein, he returned to Luxembourg.

On 18 April 1637, Ferdinand III made him a baron. In the same year, he became commander of the Luxembourg fortress. The year after, he was made provisional governor of the Duchy of Luxembourg and the county of Chiny. This became official on 18 January 1642. In 1643, he became maître de camp général of the army.

In 1639, Beck commanded the Spanish and Imperial vanguard at the relief of Thionville. In the same year, he bought Beaufort Castle and built a new castle next to it.

De Beck never forgot his humble origins. Despite acquiring a substantial fortune, he remained generous.

In the Battle of Lens, he was wounded on 20 August 1648 and transported to Arras, where he refused all medical care. A few days later he died of his wounds.

The Bastion Beck of the Luxembourg fortress is named after him. It was built in 1644, where the Place de la Constitution is today. Likewise, rue Beck in the city is named after him.

External link

Luxembourgian soldiers
1588 births
1648 deaths
People from Luxembourg City
Generals of the Holy Roman Empire
Military personnel of the Franco-Spanish War (1635–1659)